The Essex emerald (Thetidia smaragdaria) is a moth of the family Geometridae. The species was first described by Johan Christian Fabricius in 1787 as Phalaena smaragdaria. It is distributed throughout the Palearctic region with records from many European countries. The British subspecies Thetidia smaragdaria maritima was last seen in 1991 in Kent and is now presumed extinct. In 2004 the moth was first recorded from Sweden.

The wingspan is 27–35 mm. There is one generation per year with adults on wing from mid-June to mid-July.

The larvae feed on Artemisia maritima and Achillea millefolium. Larvae can be found from July to June the following year. It overwinters in the larval stage.

Subspecies
Thetidia smaragdaria smaragdaria
Thetidia smaragdaria gigantea Milliere, 1874
Thetidia smaragdaria maritima Prout, 1935
Thetidia smaragdaria volgaria Guenee, 1858

References

External links

Essex emerald at UKMoths
Fauna Europaea
Lepiforum e.V.

Geometrinae
Palearctic Lepidoptera
Taxa named by Johan Christian Fabricius
Moths described in 1787